Sir Nicholas Felix Stadlen (born 3 May 1950) is a former judge of the High Court of England and Wales. He was appointed to the High Court's Queen's Bench Division on 2 October 2007 and retired early, on 21 April 2013.

His parents were political activist Hedi Stadlen and pianist and composer Peter Stadlen. He was educated at St Paul's School, London and Trinity College, Cambridge, where he read history and classics and was president of the Cambridge Union in 1970.

He was working as a busboy in New York's Times Square on April 4, 1968, when the assassination of Martin Luther King Jr. happened in Memphis, and travelled to the south to witness the extraordinary events following his death. This awakened him to the issue of racism, which led to a lifelong interest.

In 1972 he married Frances Edith Howarth. He was called to the bar in 1976 and became a QC in 1991, and was a member of Fountain Court Chambers.

In 2006–07 he conducted a series of interviews with well-known figures (Gerry Adams, Desmond Tutu, F. W. de Klerk, Simon Peres, Hanan Ashrawi, Tony Benn and David Blunkett) which were podcast by The Guardian.

In 2005 he made the longest speech in British legal history when he spoke for 119 days while defending the Bank of England at the Royal Courts of Justice.

He was knighted in 2007.

Since retirement in 2013, he has been researching the history of the anti-apartheid struggle in South Africa and has been writing a book on the Rivonia Trial, which led to Nelson Mandela's imprisonment. In 2015–6 he was awarded the Alistair Horne Visiting Fellow Fellowship, an "annual fellowship designed to encourage the completion of works in modern history and biography which combine academic scholarship and a wider public appeal", at St Antony's College, Oxford, to work on his book Bram Fischer QC and the Unsung Heroes of the Struggle Against Apartheid 1960–1966 ( unpublished).

In 2015 he appeared on the BBC Radio 4 programme Great Lives, nominating anti-apartheid lawyer Bram Fischer.

In 2017 Sir Nicholas directed a documentary film entitled Life is Wonderful, featuring the then remaining survivors of the Rivonia trial, Denis Goldberg, Andrew Mlangeni and Ahmed Kathrada, along with lawyers Joel Joffe, George Bizos and Denis Kuny, which tells the story of the Rivonia trial. The title reflects Goldberg's words to his mother at the end of the trial on hearing that he and his comrades had been spared the death sentence, and Sir Nicholas said that he was inspired to make the film after spending a day with Goldberg.

References

1950 births
Living people
Place of birth missing (living people)
Queen's Bench Division judges
Alumni of Trinity College, Cambridge
Presidents of the Cambridge Union
Knights Bachelor
People educated at St Paul's School, London